Łódź Retkinia is a commuter railway station in the Polish city of Łódź, in Polesie district, on the outskirts of the Retkinia housing neighbourhood. The station is located on the Łódź-Tuplice railway between Łódź Kaliska and Łódź Lublinek stations.

The station was planned as a part of Phase Two of Łódź Metropolitan Railway project, along with Warszawska and Radogoszcz Wschód stations on the circle line. An agreement to conduct the design of the station was signed on 27 December 2018. Construction works began in June 2020, and were completed in March 2021. The station was put into service on 13 June 2021.

Train services
The station is served by the following services:

 Intercity services (IC) Zgorzelec - Legnica - Wrocław - Ostrów Wielkopolski - Łódź - Warszawa
 InterRegio services (IR) Ostrów Wielkopolski — Łódź — Warszawa Główna
 InterRegio services (IR) Poznań Główny — Ostrów Wielkopolski — Łódź — Warszawa Główna
 Regiona services (PR) Łódź Kaliska — Ostrów Wielkopolski 
 Regional services (PR) Łódź Kaliska — Ostrów Wielkopolski — Poznań Główny

Gallery

References 

Railway stations in Poland opened in 2021
Retkinia